Sergey Alexandrovich Goryunov (born 29 April 1958) is a professional association football coach from Russia and a former Soviet player.

External links
 

1958 births
Living people
Russian footballers
Soviet footballers
FC Kuban Krasnodar players
Association football defenders
Association football midfielders